The 1990 Players Championship was a golf tournament in Florida on the PGA Tour, held  at TPC Sawgrass in Ponte Vedra Beach, southeast of Jacksonville. It was the seventeenth Players Championship. 

Jodie Mudd won the title at 278 (−10), one stroke ahead of runner-up Mark Calcavecchia.

Defending champion Tom Kite finished seven strokes back, in a tie for fifth place.

Venue

This was the ninth Players Championship held at the TPC at Sawgrass Stadium Course.

Field
John Adams, Fulton Allem, Michael Allen, Billy Andrade, Isao Aoki, Tommy Armour III, Paul Azinger, Ian Baker-Finch, Dave Barr, Andy Bean, Chip Beck, Ronnie Black, Phil Blackmar, Jay Don Blake, Jim Booros, Bill Britton, Mark Brooks, Billy Ray Brown, Brad Bryant, George Burns, Clark Burroughs, Bill Buttner, Curt Byrum, Tom Byrum, Mark Calcavecchia, Jim Carter, Russ Cochran, Fred Couples, Ben Crenshaw, Jay Delsing, Clark Dennis, Mike Donald, Bob Eastwood, David Edwards, Joel Edwards, Dave Eichelberger, Steve Elkington, Bob Estes, Brad Faxon, Rick Fehr, Ed Fiori, Raymond Floyd, Dan Forsman, David Frost, Jim Gallagher Jr., Robert Gamez, Buddy Gardner, Bob Gilder, Bill Glasson, Wayne Grady, David Graham, Hubert Green, Ken Green, Jay Haas, Gary Hallberg, Jim Hallet, Donnie Hammond, Webb Heintzelman, Lon Hinkle, Scott Hoch, Mike Hulbert, John Inman, Hale Irwin, Peter Jacobsen, Steve Jones, Tom Kite, Kenny Knox, Wayne Levi, Bruce Lietzke, Bob Lohr, Davis Love III, Mark Lye, Sandy Lyle, Andrew Magee, John Mahaffey, Roger Maltbie, Billy Mayfair, Mark McCumber, Pat McGowan, Rocco Mediate, Larry Mize, Gil Morgan, Jodie Mudd, Larry Nelson, Jack Nicklaus, Greg Norman, Andy North, Mark O'Meara, David Ogrin, Masashi Ozaki, Craig Parry, Jerry Pate, Steve Pate, Corey Pavin, Calvin Peete, David Peoples, Chris Perry, Kenny Perry, Peter Persons, Don Pooley, Nick Price, Tom Purtzer, Mike Reid, Larry Rinker, Loren Roberts, Clarence Rose, Dave Rummells, Bill Sander, Gene Sauers, Ted Schulz, Don Shirey Jr., Tom Sieckmann, Tony Sills, Scott Simpson, Tim Simpson, Joey Sindelar, Jeff Sluman, J. C. Snead, Craig Stadler, Payne Stewart, Ray Stewart, Curtis Strange, Mike Sullivan, Hal Sutton, Lance Ten Broeck, Brian Tennyson, Doug Tewell, Leonard Thompson, Jim Thorpe, Kirk Triplett, Bob Tway, Greg Twiggs, Howard Twitty, Stan Utley, Bobby Wadkins, Lanny Wadkins, Duffy Waldorf, Denis Watson, Tom Watson, D. A. Weibring, Mark Wiebe, Robert Wrenn, Fuzzy Zoeller, Richard Zokol

Round summaries

First round
Thursday, March 15, 1990

Source:

Second round
Friday, March 16, 1990

Source:

Third round
Saturday, March 17, 1990
Sunday, March 18, 1990

Due to weather delays, Mudd completed the last fourteen holes of his third round on Sunday morning. 

Source:

Final round
Sunday, March 18, 1990

References

External links
The Players Championship website

1990
1990 in golf
1990 in American sports
1990 in sports in Florida
March 1990 sports events in the United States